Xenophrys vegrandis is a species of frog in the family Megophryidae from West Kameng District, Arunachal Pradesh, India.

References

vegrandis
Endemic fauna of India
Amphibians of India
Amphibians described in 2013